Kasme Vaade is a 1978 Hindi action thriller film produced and directed by Ramesh Behl. The film stars Amitabh Bachchan, Raakhee, Randhir Kapoor, Neetu Singh and Amjad Khan. Randhir Kapoor earned a Filmfare nomination as Best Supporting Actor, the only nomination for the film.  Rekha makes a guest appearance as a dancer. The music is by R. D. Burman and the lyrics by Gulshan Bawra. The film was declared a semi-hit by Box Office India. The film was remade in Telugu as Chesina Basalu (1980), in Sinhalese as Nawatha Hamuwemu (1982) and in Tamil as Dharmathin Thalaivan (1988).

Plot

Suman (Raakhee) and Amit (Amitabh Bachchan) love each other and plan to marry soon. Amit lives with his younger brother, Raju (Randhir Kapoor), and Raju already calls Suman "Bhabhi". Amit is a teacher in a college, but Raju is unemployed and a little bit spoiled by Amit and Suman's pamperings.

Raju gets into bad company, and as a result, lands in trouble. When Amit comes to help Raju, he is killed. Suman dons the garb of a widow and plans not to marry again.

Then one day a look-alike of Amit, named Shankar enters Suman and Raju's life. Guilt-ridden, Raju thinks that he has gotten his brother back, and tries to make amends by hiring Shankar, not knowing that Shankar is a wanted criminal, and is looking for an escape route from the authorities.

Raju's guilty unconditional support and love along with the, for obvious reasons, confusing for both, but the electric attraction between Shankar and Suman eventually wins Shankar over from his past evil ways. Nevertheless, Shankar can not so easily escape his past.

Suman is kidnapped in order to force Shankar to aid a kingpin by using an international car rally championship as cover to smuggle diamonds. With Raju's help, of course, good prevails over evil and symbolically, Shanker is wounded protecting Suman and as they role free of the shooting and explosions and come to rest, it is seen that Suman's forehead has been marked crimson by the blood of her soul mate. Raju has learned a heart-crushing lesson in the dangers of excess and frivolity but in the end, there is hope and greater wisdom.

Neetu Singh also had a small role as the fiancée of Raju (Randhir Kapoor). Amjad Khan was the main villain while Vijayendra Ghatge played the killer of Amit. The film's song "Aati Rahengi Baharen". "Mile Jo Kadi Kadi, Ek Zanjeer Bane" and the title song "Kasme Vaade Nibhayenge Hum" had become very popular.

Cast
Amitabh Bachchan as Professor Amit / Shankar (Double role)
Raakhee as Suman 
Randhir Kapoor as Raju
Neetu Singh as Neeta
Vijayendra Ghatge as Kundan Ghanshyamdas (as Vijayendra)
Rekha (Guest appearance)
Amjad Khan as Juda (The hunch back Villain)
 Sharat Saxena as Goon

Soundtrack

All the songs were composed by Rahul Dev Burman and lyrics were penned by Gulshan Bawra. The entire soundtrack is on Polydor now Universal Music Group. The song "Kal Kya Hoga Kisko Pata" is partly based on "Hafanana" by Afric Simone.

References

External links
 

1978 films
1970s Hindi-language films
Films scored by R. D. Burman
Hindi films remade in other languages
Rose Audio Visuals
Films directed by Ramesh Behl